Gallium arsenide phosphide is a semiconductor material, an alloy of gallium arsenide and gallium phosphide. It exists in various composition ratios indicated in its formula by the fraction x.

Gallium arsenide phosphide is used for manufacturing red, orange and yellow light-emitting diodes. It is often grown on gallium phosphide substrates to form a GaP/GaAsP heterostructure. In order to tune its electronic properties, it may be doped with nitrogen (GaAsP:N).

See also
 Gallium arsenide
 Gallium indium arsenide antimonide phosphide
 Gallium phosphide
 Indium gallium arsenide phosphide
 Indium gallium phosphide

References

III-V semiconductors
Gallium compounds
Arsenides
Phosphides
III-V compounds
Light-emitting diode materials
Zincblende crystal structure